Piracy in Scotland dates back to the presence of Viking pirates in Scotland in 617. Later, Scotland was the homeland of many privateers, including Captain William Kidd. Some scholars have argued that the lifestyles of Scottish clans in the borderlands was similar to those of pirates.

Notable Instances of Piracy in Scotland 

The Viking Sweyn Asleifsson was born in 1115 in Caithness and later lived in the Orkney Islands. From this home base he raided the British Isles around 1150.  Around 1549, pirates resided on the islands of Pabay and Longay. The MacNeils of Barra frequently engaged in piracy to financially provide for the clan. The most famous was Ruari Og MacNeil. He particularly targeted English ships, leading Queen Elizabeth I to urge King James VI to seize his lands. The last Scottish pirate was Peter Lyle, who was a Barbary pirate. He converted to Islam in 1796, after which he raided from the former American ship Betsy. Other famous pirates from Scotland include the following:

Captain William Kidd
 John Gow
James Browne
John Alexander
Andrew Barton 
Alexander Dalzeel
Red Legs Greaves
Thorbjorn Thornsteinsson

Scottish Borders 
Between 1567 and 1572 the borderlands between Scotland and England were inhabited by clans referred to as reiver families. The term comes from the word "areiving", which means raiding. The most powerful of these families were the Armstrongs and the Eliotts.Though they were not pirates on the sea, their lifestyle was very similar. They disavowed allegiance to any outside the clan and raided neighboring clans to gain wealth and territories.

Effects of Piracy on Scotland 

King James I became king of Scotland in 1424 after being kidnapped by pirates and sold to King Henry IV of England nineteen years earlier. Piracy presented security and economic problems to west Scotland, especially on the islands of Canna.

Privateers in Scotland 

Before the passing of the Piracy Act 1717, Scottish privateers were allowed to engage in piracy activities, such as plundering warships. The main difference between pirates and privateers is that privateers were given a permit by their sovereign country, which pardoned them from all legal actions taken against pirates. These government issued permits were called Letters of Marque.

Former privateers, such as Captain William Kidd, were issued Letters of Marque from their prospective countries. In the case of Kidd, this letter was issued in 1695 by William III/II, king of England and Scotland.

References 

Scotland
Crime in Scotland